The Logie Hall of Fame is a specialised industry-voted award presented annually at the Australian TV Week Logie Awards. It was first awarded at the 26th Annual TV Week Logie Awards held in 1984. The award is given to recognise the outstanding contribution and achievements of individuals to the Australian television industry such as actors, producers, directors and writers, as well as iconic television programs. Below is the list of all who have been inducted into the Hall of Fame.

Recipients

See also
 List of television awards

References

Awards established in 1984
Hall of Fame
Logie
Logie
Television award winners